George Paton (1 March 1879 – 5 October 1950) was an Australian cricketer. He played 21 first-class matches for Tasmania between 1898 and 1914.

See also
 List of Tasmanian representative cricketers

References

External links
 

1879 births
1950 deaths
Australian cricketers
Tasmania cricketers
Cricketers from Hobart